The 2022–23 Estonian Cup is the 33rd season of the Estonian main domestic football knockout tournament. Paide Linnameeskond is the defending champion.

First Round (1/64)
The draw was made by Estonian Football Association on 21 May 2022.
League level of the club in the brackets.
Rahvaliiga – RL (people's league) is a league organized by Estonian Football Association, but not part of the main league system.

Byes
These teams were not drawn and secured a place in the second round without playing:

FC Järva-Jaani, FC Nõmme United , JK Tallinna Kalev U21, JK Saare Latte (RL), Pärnu JK Vaprus, Harju JK Laagri, FC Jõgeva Wolves, FC Elva, JK Kernu Kadakas, Tallinna FC Zapoos, Maarjamäe FC Vigri, Tallinna JK Jalgpallihaigla, Tallinna FC EstHam United, Rakvere JK Tarvas, Jõhvi FC Phoenix, Saku Sporting, Tallinna JK Piraaja, Tallinna FC Zenit, Tallinna FC Teleios, Läänemaa JK, FC Tallinna Wolves, Raplamaa JK, Nõmme Kalju FC, FC Tallinn, Pärnu JK Poseidon, Tartu Team Helm, Kristiine JK, Nõmme Kalju FC U21, JK Tallinna Kalev, JK Lääneranna (RL), FC Jager (RL), Tallinna FC TransferWise, Pärnu Jalgpalliklubi, Valga FC Warrior, Viljandi JK Tulevik, FC Mulgi (RL), FC Äksi Wolves, Tallinna FC Soccernet, Märjamaa Kompanii, Tartu JK Welco, Ida-Virumaa FC Alliance, Rumori Calcio Tallinn, Tallinna FC Flora U21, Vändra JK Vaprus II ja FC Lelle ÜM

Second round (1/32)
The draw for the second round was also made on 21 May 2022.

Third round (1/16)
The draw for the third round was made on 25 July 2022.

Fourth round (1/8)

Quarter-finals
The draw for the quarter-finals was made on 26 February 2023. Between the 2022 and 2023 season there were changes involving remaining teams:
JK Tabasalu and FC Tallinn both managed to get promotion after successful 2022 Esiliiga B season and now play at second-level Esiliiga
Jõhvi FC Phoenix joined with JK Noova and was named Jõhvi FC Phoenix/JK Noova United

References

External links
 Official website 
 Estonian Cup on Soccerway.com

Estonian Cup seasons
Cup
Cup
Estonian
Estonian Cup